Xanthostigma is a genus of snakeflies belonging to the family Raphidiidae.

The species of this genus are found in Europe.

Species:
 Xanthostigma aloysianum (Costa, 1855) 
 Xanthostigma corsicum (Hagen, 1867)
 Xanthostigma gobicola (U.Aspöck & H.Aspöck, 1990)
 Xanthostigma xantostigma (Schummel, 1832)
 Xanthostigma zdravka'' (Popov, 1978)

References

Raphidiidae